Pol-e Siah, or the Black Bridge, in Ahvaz, Iran, is a national heritage site.

It was constructed in 1929.

References

Ahvaz
Bridges in Iran
Bridges across the River Karoun